Red Planet is a nickname for the planet Mars, due to its surface color.
It may also refer to:

 Mission: Red Planet, a 2005 boardgame by Bruno Cathala and Bruno Faidutti
 Red Planet (novel) by Robert A. Heinlein (1949)
 Red Planet (miniseries), a 1994 animated adaptation of the novel
 Red Planet, the source of the J-Jewel in The King of Braves GaoGaiGar
 Red Planet (film), a 2000 film starring Val Kilmer
 Red Planet (game), a BattleTech game scenario (ca. 1993)
 Red Planet Hotels, a regional hotel chain in Indonesia, Japan, the Philippines and Thailand
 Red Planet Mars a 1952 film based on a 1932 play Red Planet
 "Red Planet", a song by Little Mix featuring T-Boz from their debut album, DNA (2012)
 "Red Planet", a song by Alvvays from their eponymous debut album (2014)
 The Red Planet, an album by Rick Wakeman (2020)